Information Sources in Law is a book.

First Edition
The first edition was edited by R G Logan and published by Butterworths in 1986. It is part of the series which was then known as Butterworths Guides to Information Sources. It consists of twenty-three chapters attributed to twenty contributors. The subject-matter of these chapters ranges from the general to the specialized. A book on legal research describes Information Sources in Law as being "not as useful for present purposes" as the title promises. Information Sources in Law is "detailed" and its contributors are "leading experts".

Second Edition
The second edition was edited by Jules Winterton and Elizabeth M Moys and published by Bowker-Saur in 1997. The series of which it was part was now known as Guides to Information Sources. It is "completely revised". It focuses on Europe, and deals with more than thirty of its jurisdictions.

References
Logan, R G (editor). Information Sources in Law. Butterworths. London. 1986. .
Winterton, Jules; Moys, Elizabeth M (editors). Information Sources in Law. Second Edition. Bowker-Saur. 1997. . Preview from Google Books. De Gruyter.
Munday, Roderick. "Book Reviews" (1986) 45 Cambridge Law Journal 357 - 358. JSTOR.
"Information Sources in Law, editor: R G Logan". The Law Society Gazette. 10 September 1986. Digitised copy
Tickle, Teresa. "Reference Books of 1997 - 1998: A Selection" (Autumn 1999) Slavic Review. Vol 58, No 3. Pages 723 - 724. JSTOR.
(1998) 29 The Law Librarian 124 (Google Books)
Peter Clinch. Legal Information: What it is and Where to Find it. Second Edition. Aslib. 2005. . Google Books.

Law books